Marvin R. Couch is an American politician. He served as a Republican member for the 33rd district of the Florida House of Representatives.

Couch was chairman of the Orange County Republican Party. In 1992, he won the election for the 33rd district of the Florida House of Representatives. Couch succeeded politician, Harry C. Goode. He resigned in March 1996.

References 

Living people
Place of birth missing (living people)
Year of birth missing (living people)
Republican Party members of the Florida House of Representatives
20th-century American politicians